United Instrument Manufacturing Corporation or UIMC was a Russian state-owned company, which was founded in March 2014 within state corporation Rostec as a specialized management company uniting research and production enterprises of radioelectronic industry of Russia. Rostec owned 9.3% of the shares as of April 2015. The company merged with Ruselectronics in February 2017.

They manufactured Sozvezdie's electronic warfare weapon system Borisoglebsk 2. The corporation comprised 40 companies from scratch, and this number increased to above 60. These 60 companies had a total of 43,000 employees in 2017.

The UIMC board included seven members, with Grigory Elkin as interim CEO in July 2017.

Sanctions 
Sanctioned by New Zealand in relation to the 2022 Russian invasion of Ukraine.

Products 
UIMC subsidiary Sozvezdie launched software-defined radios (SDR) at the end of 2021. TASS 82403177 is a SDR radio can hardly be jammed with electronic countermeasures.

References

 
Rostec
Defence companies of Russia
Companies based in Moscow